Diargemus is a genus of flies in the family Stratiomyidae.

Distribution
South Africa.

Species
Diargemus flavipes Kertész, 1916

References

Stratiomyidae
Brachycera genera
Taxa named by Kálmán Kertész
Diptera of Africa
Endemic insects of South Africa